The 30th Cuban National Series ended with Henequeros winning its second straight title. La Habana, Camagüey and Santiago de Cuba also qualified for the playoffs.

Standings

Western zone

Eastern zone

Playoffs

References

 (Note - text is printed in a white font on a white background, depending on browser used.)

Cuban National Series seasons
Base
Base
Cuba